Darling of the Sailors (German: Liebling der Matrosen) is a 1937 Austrian comedy film directed by Hans Hinrich and starring Traudl Stark, Wolf Albach-Retty and Richard Romanowsky.

The film's sets were designed by the art director Hans Ledersteger. It was shot on location around Dubrovnik on the Croatian coast.

Cast
 Traudl Stark as Christl Hofer 
 Wolf Albach-Retty as Kapitänleutnant Igor Juritsch 
 Richard Romanowsky as Generalkonsul O'Brien 
 Hertha Feiler as Mary O'Brien 
 Lotte Lang as Anita - Kindermädchen 
 Hans Frank as Kommandant des Kriegsschiffes 
 Julius Brandt as Kapitän des Handelsschiffes 
 Hans Unterkircher as Fürst Wurozeff 
 Eduard Loibner as Bootsmaat 
 Willi Hufnagel as Matrose Stefan 
 Karl Ehmann as Jean, Diener 
 Ernst Pröckl as Reisebüroangestellter 
 Mihail Xantho as Polizeikommissar 
 Philipp von Zeska as Steward 
 Polly Koß as Mara 
 Otto Ambros as Matrose 
 Hans Ferigo as Matrose 
 Fritz Lieberté as Matrose 
 Otto Glaser as Schiffskoch 
 Robert Horky as Kofferverkäufer 
 August Keilholz as Hotelportier 
 Carmen Perwolf as Spielwarenverkäuferin 
 Josef Stiegler as Wohnungsvermieter

References

Bibliography 
 Jon Tuska, Vicki Piekarski & David Wilson. Close-Up: The Hollywood Director. Scarecrow Press, 1978.

External links 
 

1937 films
1937 comedy films
Austrian comedy films
1930s German-language films
Films directed by Hans Hinrich
Austrian black-and-white films
Seafaring films
Films set in the Mediterranean Sea
Films about orphans